Malacia is abnormal softening of a biological tissue, most often cartilage. The word is derived from Greek μαλακός, malakos = soft. Usually the combining form -malacia suffixed to another combining form that denotes the affected tissue assigns a more specific name to each such disorder, as follows: 

 Osteomalacia (rickets), a bone disorder from vitamin D deficiency
 Chondromalacia, softening of cartilage (often refers to chondromalacia patellae when mentioned without further specification)
 Chondromalacia patellae, a disorder of cartilage under the kneecap
 Bronchomalacia, a disorder of the bronchial tubes' cartilage
 Laryngomalacia, a disorder of the larynx's cartilage
 Tracheomalacia, a disorder of the trachea's cartilage
 Keratomalacia, an eye disorder from vitamin A deficiency
 Myelomalacia, a disorder of the spinal cord
 Cerebral softening (encephalomalacia), localized softening of brain tissue

External links

 Definition at MedineNet.com

Medical terminology